Apodocephala is a genus of flowering plants in the family Asteraceae.

 Species
All known species are endemic to Madagascar.

References

Asteraceae genera
Astereae
Endemic flora of Madagascar
Taxa named by John Gilbert Baker